Synechodes coniophora is a moth in the family Brachodidae. It was described by Turner in 1913. It is found in Australia, where it has been recorded from Queensland.

References

Natural History Museum Lepidoptera generic names catalog

Brachodidae
Moths described in 1913